The usual market requirements (UMR) of a country are a measure of its import requirement met through commercial purchases.  It is usually defined as a five-year average.

Agricultural policy

The UMR is used to determine whether concessional sales (e.g., under Title I of P.L. 480) will adversely affect normal commercial agricultural trade.

References 

Agriculture in the United States